Rutger Smith (born 9 July 1981 in Groningen) is a retired Dutch track and field athlete who competed in the shot put and discus throw. He is the first athlete to win medals at the World Championships in both events. He represented the Netherlands at the Summer Olympics in 2004, 2008 and 2012. His personal best of 21.62 m for the shot put is the Dutch national record.

In his first international competition, he won a shot put and discus double at the 1999 European Athletics Junior Championships. At the 2000 World Junior Championships he won medals in both events, and he also competed in both events at the 2004 Olympics. In 2005 he won silver medals in shot put at the European Indoor Championships and World Championships. Two years later he won the bronze medal in the discus at the 2007 World Championships and narrowly missed a shot put medal with a fourth-place finish.

A series of back problems affected his throwing after he competed at the 2008 Beijing Olympics and he did not return to competition until April 2011.

Since then he has competed at the 2012 Summer Olympics, and won a silver medal at the shot put in the 2012 European Championships. He also finished fourth in the men's discus at the same championships. This result was later upgraded to bronze after the disqualification of Zoltán Kővágó.

Achievements

Personal bests

Shot put - 21.62 m (2006), national record
Discus throw - 67.77 m (2011)

References

1981 births
Living people
Dutch male shot putters
Dutch male discus throwers
Athletes (track and field) at the 2004 Summer Olympics
Athletes (track and field) at the 2008 Summer Olympics
Athletes (track and field) at the 2012 Summer Olympics
Olympic athletes of the Netherlands
Sportspeople from Groningen (city)
World Athletics Championships medalists
European Athletics Championships medalists